Sam Apelbaum is a politician in Ontario, Canada.  A lawyer and real estate agent, he was leader of the Ontario Libertarian Party from 1996 to 2011.

Like many other members of the Libertarian Party, Apelbaum believes in reducing government participation in education and healthcare and widespread taxation reform, and criticized the Progressive Conservative government of Mike Harris as being too statist in its policies.

Apelbaum stabilized the struggling party's finances, but failed to make a significant impression with the general voting public.

Electoral record

1995 Ontario general election, Scarborough East, 319 votes (winning candidate: Steve Gilchrist, Progressive Conservative)
1999 Ontario general election, Scarborough East, 368 votes (winning candidate: Steve Gilchrist, Progressive Conservative)
2003 Ontario general election, Scarborough East, 285 votes (winning candidate: Mary Anne Chambers, Liberal)

References

External links

Year of birth missing (living people)
Living people
Leaders of the Ontario Libertarian Party
20th-century Canadian lawyers
Place of birth missing (living people)